The year 1880 in architecture involved some significant architectural events and new buildings.

Buildings and structures

Buildings

 August 14 – Cologne Cathedral in Cologne, Germany, is completed after 632 years.
 Berlin Anhalter Bahnhof (railway station) in Berlin, Germany, rebuilt by Franz Heinrich Schwechten, is completed.
 Manchester Central railway station in Manchester, England is completed.
 Royal Exhibition Building, Melbourne is completed.
 Yıldız Palace, Istanbul, Turkey, is built.

Awards
 RIBA Royal Gold Medal – John Loughborough Pearson.
 Grand Prix de Rome, architecture: Louis Girault.

Births
 April 1 – Louis Laybourne Smith – Australian architect (died 1965)
 April 9 – Jan Letzel, Czech architect (died 1925)
 May 4 – Bruno Taut, German architect and urban planner (died 1938)
 May 19 – Albert Richardson, English architect, writer, and professor of architecture (died 1964)
 May 25 – Eižens Laube, Latvian architect (died 1967)
 June 15 – Aymar Embury II, American architect (died 1966)
 October 23 – Dominikus Böhm, German church architect (died 1955)
 November 9 – Giles Gilbert Scott, English architect, son of George Gilbert Scott, Jr. (died 1960)

Deaths
 January 27 – Edward Middleton Barry, English architect (born 1830)
 May 25 – Richard Lane, English architect (born 1795)
 August 22 – Benjamin Ferrey, English architect (born 1810)

Developments
 Margaret Hicks became the first woman to graduate from an architecture course at an American university.

References

Architecture
Years in architecture
19th-century architecture